The Speed Art Museum, originally known as the J.B. Speed Memorial Museum, now colloquially referred to as the Speed by locals, is the oldest and largest art museum in Kentucky. It was established in 1927 in Louisville, Kentucky on Third Street next to the University of Louisville Belknap campus. It receives around 180,000 visits annually.

The museum offers visitors a variety of "art experiences" outside its collection and international exhibitions, including the Speed Concert Series, the Art Sparks Interactive Family Gallery, and the late-night event, After Hours at the Speed.

The Speed houses ancient, classical, and modern art from around the world. The focus of the collection is Western art, from antiquity to the present day. Holdings of paintings from the Netherlands, France, and Italy are prominent, and contemporary art and sculptures are also featured.

History

The museum was built in 1927 by Arthur Loomis in the Neo-Classical style. Loomis was already well known in Louisville for landmarks like the Louisville Medical College and Levy Brothers. The original building was designed as an understated Beaux-Arts limestone facade. Hattie Bishop Speed established the museum in memory of her husband James Breckenridge Speed, a prominent Louisville businessman, art collector, and philanthropist. Speed set up the endowment to fund the museum, encouraging the museum to never charge admission.

The museum underwent a $60 million expansion and renovation project from September 2012 to March 2016, designed by architect Kulapat Yantrasast of wHY architecture. During the closure, the museum opened Local Speed, a satellite space in Louisville's East Market District (NuLu) for rotating exhibitions, programs, and events.

The 62,500-square-foot North Building doubled the overall square footage and nearly tripled the gallery space from the previous wing. The expansion created a space for larger special exhibitions, new contemporary art galleries, a family education welcome center, a 150-seat cinema, indoor/outdoor café, museum shop, and a multi-functional pavilion for performances, lectures and entertainment. Additionally, the new Elizabeth P. and Frederick K. Cressman Art Park and Public Piazza was created for the display of sculptures.

Timeline 
1927 – The Speed Art Museum is built and receives more than 74,000 visitors in the first year.

1928 – The centenary of Kentucky portrait painter Matthew Harris Jouett is celebrated with an exhibition of his portraits, many owned by prominent Louisvillians.

1933 – The museum is incorporated as a privately endowed institution and its board of governors was established.

1934 – The museum received its first major donation, a valuable collection of North American Indian artifacts given by Dr. Frederick Weygold.

1941 – Dr. Preston Pope Satterwhite donates his collection of 15th century and 16th century French and Italian Decorative Arts including tapestries and furniture.

1944 – Satterwhite donates the English Renaissance room, which was moved in its entirety from Devon, England. Dr. Satterwhite's gift necessitated an enlargement of the museum and in his will he provided for the addition that bears his name. Completed in 1954, it was the first of three additions to the original building.

1946 – Paul S. Harris becomes the first professional director of the museum. During his tenure, acquisitions to the collection were made mostly in the areas of decorative arts and furniture.

1964 – Recently donated paintings and furniture from the collection of Mrs. W. Blakemore Wheeler go on view including works by Mary Cassatt, John Constable, Gustave Courbet, Thomas Gainsborough, Paul Gauguin, Pierre-Auguste Renoir, Maurice Utrillo, and James Abbott McNeill Whistler.

1966 – Charter Collectors Group forms to assist the museum in the acquisition of pre-1940 art.

1970 – New Art Collectors Group forms to assist the museum to acquire contemporary art.

1973 – The North Wing of the museum opens, giving new space for a theatre, offices, indoor sculpture court, and library.

1977 – The Speed celebrates its 50th anniversary in 1977 with the acquisition of Rembrandt's Portrait of a Woman, one of the museum's most significant acquisitions.

1983 – The 1983 Wing opens, designed by Robert Geddes of Princeton. The new wing adds gallery space for permanent collections and special exhibitions.

1996 – Alice Speed Stoll dies, bequeathing over $50 million to the museum. The Speed closes to undertake an extensive renovation. Newer lighting, heating and cooling systems, multi-layered labels about the collection, the Laramie L. Learning Center, and Art Sparks Interactive Family Gallery are put into place.

1997 – The museum reopens.

2012 – The museum begins another major transition with a $60 million expansion project that will create a space for larger special exhibitions, new contemporary art galleries, a family education welcome center, 150-seat cinema, indoor/outdoor café, museum shop, and a multi-functional pavilion for performances, lectures and entertaining. The museum is closed to the public for three years during the construction period.

2013 – The Speed staff relocates offsite to the downtown Louisville neighborhood of Phoenix Hill and opens Local Speed, a satellite space for exhibitions, family activities, programs and special events.

2016 – The museum reopens on March 12.

Collection

The Speed houses a collection of African art, ancient art, Native American art, American art, European art, and contemporary art.

Highlights of the collection include works by:

European painting and sculpture

Modernism

American painting and sculpture

Contemporary art

Directors 

 2017-2021: Stephen Reily
 2021-present: Raphaela Platow

See also

 List of attractions and events in the Louisville metropolitan area

References

External links

 Official site
 Listing on ArtFacts.net
 Listing on MuseumsUSA

Arts venues in Louisville, Kentucky
Art museums and galleries in Kentucky
Museums in Louisville, Kentucky
Art museums established in 1927
1927 establishments in Kentucky